Alois Cetkovský (5 September 1908 – 13 November 1987) was a Czech ice hockey player. He competed in the men's tournament at the 1936 Winter Olympics.

References

External links
 

1908 births
1987 deaths
Czech ice hockey forwards
Olympic ice hockey players of Czechoslovakia
Ice hockey players at the 1936 Winter Olympics
Sportspeople from Prostějov
LHK Jestřábi Prostějov players
Czechoslovak ice hockey forwards
People from the Margraviate of Moravia